Causa is a genus of air-breathing land snails, terrestrial pulmonate gastropod mollusks in the family Helicidae.

Species 
Species within the genus Causa include:
 Causa holosericea (S. Studer, 1820)

References

 Groenenberg D.S.J., Subai P. & Gittenberger E. (2016). Systematics of Ariantinae (Gastropoda, Pulmonata, Helicidae), a new approach to an old problem. Contributions to Zoology. 85(1): 37-65

External links
 ZipcodeZoo info at: 

Helicidae
Gastropod genera